The Montgomery Bears were a professional indoor football team that played their home games at the Garrett Coliseum in Montgomery, Alabama. They are a member of the American Indoor Football Association.  The team began play as the Montgomery Maulers of the National Indoor Football League and won the Atlantic Conference Central Division Championship in 2005. The 2005 season ended in the conference playoff semifinals of the Rome Renegades, who went on to appear in the NIFL Championship Indoor Bowl V.

The team folded in October 2007.

Entire team fired
Late in April 2006, the second year of the club's existence, Donald Jackson, an attorney representing members of the team said the club had not paid the players, staff or coaches in more than a month. The team's owner (Jamie LaMunyon) made national news on April 27, 2006, by terminating the contracts of all players and announcing that replacements would be hired.

New ownership
On May 3, 2006, the Maulers came under new ownership. After losing five of their first six games, the team has rallied under new management, winning five of the next six (the lone defeat was a 1-point overtime loss in an away game). The Maulers showed their renewed tenacity most recently in the Osceola rematch. After a downed Montgomery player was speared in the back of the head (with no penalty having been assessed), the teams broke out into a 17-minute bench clearing brawl resulting in 19 players being ejected. Montgomery managed to overcome a 15-point deficit in the fourth quarter to pull off the 1 point win. Although this was officially the second time these teams have played, the first meeting was actually fielded by players from the SSFL's Gulf Coast Raiders (a team owned by Michael Mink) due to the previously mentioned contract disputes. Following the loss, Michael Mink and John Morris decided to become more involved with arena football and purchased the Maulers franchise with Mink becoming head coach and Morris becoming general manager. Subsequently, a number of Raiders players have been signed to the Maulers roster, which has brewed speculation that the Raiders will be used as a farm team for the Maulers.

2006 playoffs
Following a drumming by the top ranked Fayetteville Guard, the Maulers were 6-7 overall and surprisingly made the playoffs. Tied for 7th place in the conference with the Charleston Sandsharks who was scheduled in the final game of the regular season, the winner was to receive the final playoff spot (only 6 teams per conference would qualify). The Maulers lost the game 28-39, but Charleston's general manager Al Bannister had already stated the organization would skip the playoffs and focus on next season. It was noticed that the official NIFL web site had an asterisk by the team's name and stated no team with outstanding operational items (stats) would be eligible for the playoffs. Later, it was revealed the franchise had cheated by using at least six illegal players and also had outstanding fines due to administrative issues (not exchanging film with opponents or keeping statistics at home games). Subsequently, the Sandsharks were banned from the playoffs for the infractions, with the Maulers being awarded the sixth Atlantic conference spot. However this all proved academic as the Maulers lost in the first week of the playoffs on July 8 at Lakeland. Falling behind 27-0 in the first quarter, Montgomery stormed back but could not make the comeback falling 70-62; they ended their season 7-8.

After the 2006 season, the team announced they were changing their name to the Montgomery Bears and moving to the American Indoor Football Association.

Season-by-season

|-
| colspan="6" align="center" | Montgomery Maulers (NIFL)
|-
|2005 || 8 || 6 || 0 || 1st Atlantic Central || Won AC Quarterfinal (M. Morays)Lost AC Semifinal (Rome)
|-
|2006 || 7 || 7 || 0 || 2nd Atlantic East || Lost AC Quarterfinal (Lakeland)
|-
| colspan="6" align="center" | Montgomery Bears (AIFA)
|-
|2007 || 5 || 9 || 0  || 5th Southern || --
|-
!Totals || 21 || 24 || 0
|colspan="2"| (including playoffs)

2007 season schedule

Current roster

Former players
 Jeff Aaron 6'3" 215 lb QB UAB
 Curtis Chance 6'3" 290 lb DL USF
 Chrys Chukwuma 6'1" 240 lb RB Arkansas
 Tim Daniels 6'2" 265 lb DE Southern
 Octavius "Gator" Day 5'7" 160 lb WR Gulf Coast
 Jamaal Fletcher 6'2" 205 lb DB ASU
 Derrick Graves 6'1" 230 lb LB Auburn
 Antoine Hill 5'11 177 lb DB ASU
 Roger Medlock 6'5" 320 lb OL ASU
 Rodrice Merkerson 6'3" 220 lb WR Concordia College, Selma
 Julius Mills 5'11" 190 lb DB ASU
 Jay Newton 5'9" 175 lb WR ASU
 Machion Sanders 5'9" 190 lb WR ASU
 J.D. Verchuere 6'3" 290 lb C Gulf Coast
 Edward Grimes III 6'3" 230 lb WR

External links
 Official Website
 Bears' 2007 Stats

Sports in Montgomery, Alabama
American Indoor Football Association teams
American football teams in Alabama